State Route 270 (SR 270), also known as Bodie Road, is a state highway in the U.S. state of California. It is a spur route off of U.S. Route 395 south of Bridgeport in Mono County, leading into Bodie State Historic Park.

Route description

The route connects U.S. Route 395 with Bodie State Historic Park. About  before entering this park, which holds a preserved ghost town, the road becomes unpaved and is maintained by the California Department of Parks and Recreation (California State Parks) instead of Caltrans. 

SR 270 is not part of the National Highway System, a network of highways that are considered essential to the country's economy, defense, and mobility by the Federal Highway Administration.

Major intersections

See also

References

External links

California @ AARoads.com - State Route 270
Caltrans: Route 270 highway conditions
California Highways: SR 270

270
State Route 270